Haplochromis pharyngomylus is a species of cichlid endemic to Lake Victoria.  This species can reach a length of  SL. This species feeds mainly on mollusks with both bivalves and gastropods eaten in approximately equal proportions.

It is only found in the littoral and sub-littoral zone with a firm substrate such as sand or rock and it feeds on molluscs which it crushes using its pharyngeal teeth.

References

pharyngomylus
Fish described in 1929
Fish of Lake Victoria
Taxonomy articles created by Polbot